Wyoming State Forest was the name of the Pennsylvania State Forest in Pennsylvania Bureau of Forestry District #20. As of July 1, 2005, a reorganization of Pennsylvania State Forests in eastern Pennsylvania resulted in the elimination of the name "Wyoming State Forest". The District #20 main office was located in Bloomsburg in Columbia County, Pennsylvania in the United States.

The state forest lands in Sullivan county became part of the new Loyalsock State Forest (still District #20), along with state forest lands in eastern Lycoming County (previously part of Tiadaghton State Forest) and Bradford County (previously part of Tioga State Forest).

Prior to the reorganization, the Wyoming State Forest was located in Sullivan County, Pennsylvania. District #20 used to include Columbia, southern Luzerne, Montour, Northumberland, and Sullivan counties.

After the reorganization, southern Luzerne County became part of District #11 (now part of Pinchot State Forest) while Columbia, Montour and Northumberland Counties became part of District #18 (now part of Weiser State Forest).

Neighboring State Forest Districts
Before the realignment, Wyoming State Forest had the following neighbors:
 Tioga State Forest (north)
 Pinchot State Forest (east)
 Weiser State Forest (southeast)
 Tuscarora State Forest (southwest)
 Bald Eagle State Forest (west)
 Tiadaghton State Forest (northwest)

Nearby State Parks
 Worlds End State Park

See also
Jakey Hollow Natural Area

References
  Note: As of July 2006, this web page has not been updated to reflect the Pennsylvania State Forest Districts realignment.
  Alt URL 
  Note: Map showing districts before the July 1, 2005 realignment
  Note: Map showing districts after the July 1, 2005 realignment

Wyoming State Forest
Protected areas of Sullivan County, Pennsylvania